Melvin Aloysius "Primo" Preibisch (November 23, 1914 – April 12, 1980) was an American professional baseball player. He played parts of two seasons in Major League Baseball, 1940 and 1941, for the Boston Braves (known as the Bees in 1940), primarily as a center fielder.

References

Major League Baseball outfielders
Boston Braves players
Chicago White Sox scouts
Waterloo Hawks (baseball) players
Savannah Indians players
Knoxville Smokies players
Albany Senators players
Hartford Bees players
Evansville Bees players
Texas Longhorns baseball players
Baseball players from Texas
People from Sealy, Texas
1914 births
1980 deaths